Friedrich Christian Flick (born 19 September 1944), also known as Mick Flick, is a German art collector.

Life 
Trained as a lawyer, he is one of the heirs to the Flick family industrial fortune, and the founder of the Friedrich Christian Flick Collection.

Flick is the son of Otto-Ernst Flick and grandson of the Nazi sympathiser and supporter Friedrich Flick, the founder of the Flick family industrial conglomerate—who was later convicted of crimes against humanity at the Nuremberg Trials, specifically the Flick Trial.

After studying law in Munich, he obtained a doctorate in law in Hamburg. Since the 1970s, he has lived in Gstaad, Switzerland.

Flick was first married to the Spanish model Andrea de Portago. In 1985, he married Countess Maya von Schönburg-Glauchau, a daughter of Joachim, Count of Schönburg-Glauchau and Countess Beatrix Széchényi, and the older sister of Gloria, Princess of Thurn and Taxis. They have three children, but were divorced in 1993.

References

1944 births
Friedrich Christian
German art collectors
20th-century art collectors
21st-century art collectors
Jurists from Bavaria
Living people
People from Amberg-Sulzbach
People from Gstaad